Linda Southern-Heathcott (born 3 January 1963) is a Canadian equestrian. She competed in two events at the 1996 Summer Olympics.

References

External links
 

1963 births
Living people
Canadian female equestrians
Olympic equestrians of Canada
Equestrians at the 1996 Summer Olympics
Sportspeople from Calgary
Cavalry FC non-playing staff